Rwitobroto Mukherjee (also called Rwitobroto Mukhopadhyay is an Indian Bengali film and theatre actor.

Early life 
Rwitobroto Mukherjee was a graduate of Jadavpur University (Department of Comparative Literature) . He studied B.A. Comparative Literature Honours from Jadavpur University (Batch of 2018-2021).

Career 
Rwitobroto started his acting career by portraying a short role in Kahaani (2012), directed by Sujoy Ghosh. His next movie was Open Tee Bioscope, directed by Anindya Chatterjee. He played important characters in Durga Sohay and The Waterfall, a short film directed in 2018. After that, he has done a number of works like   Generation, Aami, Goyenda Junior, Boyfriends & Girlfriends & many more. He is going to start his part of shoot for another two films, one of them is Neeti Shashtra & the other is on Satyajit Ray's detective 'feluda' series by director Arindam Sil. He will be playing the role of Topse (the assistant of detective Feluda) in that film.

Works

Films

Short films and web series

Theatre

Audio drama

Awards and nominations

Personal life 
Mukhopadhyay's father Shantilal Mukherjee is also an actor in the Bengali Film and television industry.

References

External links 
 

Living people
Bengali male actors
Bengali theatre personalities
Male actors from Kolkata
Male actors in Bengali cinema
Year of birth missing (living people)